Montolieu Fox Oliphant Murray, 1st Viscount Elibank DL, JP (27 April 1840 – 20 February 1927) was a British nobleman.

The eldest son of Alexander Oliphant-Murray, 9th Lord Elibank and Emily Montgomery, he was educated privately and entered the Royal Navy in 1854. In 1860 he served in the Second Opium War aboard HMS Cambrian (medal and Taku clasp). He later served in the corvette HMS Wolverine during the Jamaica Rebellion of 1865. He retired in 1870 with the rank of Commander.

He succeeded his father as 10th Lord Elibank in 1871. He was Lord Lieutenant of Peeblesshire from 1896 to 1908. In 1911 he was created 1st Viscount Elibank.

Family
In 1868 he married Blanche Alice Scott, daughter of Dr. Edward John Scott. The couple had four sons- including Alexander William Charles Oliphant Murray (1870–1920), Gideon Oliphant-Murray (1877–1951), who succeeded his father as 2nd Viscount Elibank, and Arthur Cecil Murray (1879–1962), who succeeded his brother as 3rd Viscount Elibank- and five daughters. His eldest son, Alexander was created Baron Murray of Elibank in 1912, but predeceased his father with no children. The Viscountcy and other titles passed to his younger son.

Oliphant-Murray, Montolieu Fox
Oliphant-Murray, Montolieu Fox
Viscounts in the Peerage of the United Kingdom
Oliphant-Murray, Montolieu Fox
Oliphant-Murray, Montolieu Fox
Lord-Lieutenants of Peeblesshire
Westminster, Montolieu Oliphant-Murray, 7th Earl of
Viscounts created by George V